The 1953 Belgian Grand Prix was a Formula Two race held on 21 June 1953 at Circuit de Spa-Francorchamps. It was race 4 of 9 in the 1953 World Championship of Drivers, which was run to Formula Two rules in 1952 and 1953, rather than the Formula One regulations normally used. The 36-lap race was won by Ferrari driver Alberto Ascari after he started from second position. His teammate Luigi Villoresi finished second and Maserati driver Onofre Marimón came in third.

Race report
Two weeks after the previous World Championship race, the Dutch Grand Prix, the teams headed to the Circuit de Spa-Francorchamps in Belgium. Ferrari were once again unchanged from the previous race, retaining the lineup of Alberto Ascari, Nino Farina, Luigi Villoresi and Mike Hawthorn, while there were also privateer Ferraris for Louis Rosier and the Ecurie Francorchamps duo of Jacques Swaters and Charles de Tornaco. The Maserati factory team added Johnny Claes and a third Argentine, Onofre Marimón, to their lineup of Juan Manuel Fangio and José Froilán González, while Felice Bonetto missed this race. Toulo de Graffenried drove the only privateer Maserati at Spa. Jean Behra, whose injuries prevented his participation at Zandvoort, returned for Gordini alongside Maurice Trintignant, and the American pairing of Harry Schell and Fred Wacker, while HWM called on the services of Paul Frère (as they had done the previous year) in their third car in addition to regulars Peter Collins and Lance Macklin. The field was completed by several privateers—Berger in a Simca-Gordini, Legat in a Veritas and Pilette in a Connaught.

A record crowd of over 100,000 spectators crammed into the forest track to watch this dramatic race. The Maseratis were definitely capable of matching the Ferraris for sheer speed – Juan Manuel Fangio put in a record-shattering practice lap of 117 mph, breaking Ascari's run of five consecutive pole positions (excluding the Indianapolis 500). The defending World Champion had to settle for second place on the grid this time. The Maserati of González completed the front row, while row two consisted of the Ferraris of Farina and Villoresi. On the third row were Marimón in a Maserati, the remaining works Ferrari of Hawthorn, and Trintignant in the leading Gordini. Toulo de Graffenried, in his own Maserati, out-qualified the fourth works Maserati of Johnny Claes, with both starting from row four, while the remaining Gordinis were split between the fifth and sixth rows of the grid.

At the flag, Fangio waved González past and stunned everyone with another blitzkrieg lap of 110 mph from a standing start. After 11 laps, González had pulled out a full minute's lead, but it had taken its toll on his engine which expired, leaving Fangio half a minute clear. On lap 13, it was the other Argentine's turn to fall prey to engine troubles and so Ascari inherited the lead, initially ahead of Farina, before his race was ended by engine problems, handing second place to Hawthorn, while Marimón and Villoresi were third and fourth, respectively. Engine problems for Marimón allowed Villoresi to move up to third on lap 28, and a fuel leak for Hawthorn meant that Villoresi inherited second place on the following lap. Shortly after his own car had retired, Fangio took over Claes's, and made something of a charge through the field: before Fangio retired on lap 14, Claes had been in ninth; by lap 30, Fangio had taken the car to third, behind only Ascari and Villoresi, who took another 1–2 victory. However, Fangio crashed heavily on the final lap of the race, giving his teammate Onofre Marimón his first podium position in the process. The remaining points were taken by the privateer Maserati of de Graffenried and the Gordini of Trintignant, while Hawthorn, in sixth place, just missed out.

Alberto Ascari, who had taken his ninth consecutive World Championship victory (ignoring the Indy 500), already had a large lead in the points standings. He was twelve points ahead of his teammate Villoresi, while Bill Vukovich, who won at Indianapolis, was third. González, who took the fastest lap point for this race, now had seven points, putting him eighteen points behind Ascari, and the remaining Ferraris of Farina and Hawthorn only had six points each.

Entries

 — Johnny Claes qualified and drove 14 laps of the race in the #6 Maserati. Juan Manuel Fangio, whose own car had already retired, took over the car for the remainder of the race.

Classification

Qualifying

Race

Notes
 – 1 point for fastest lap
 Car #6: Johnny Claes (13 laps) and Juan Manuel Fangio (22 laps).

Championship standings after the race
Drivers' Championship standings

Note: Only the top five positions are included.

References

Belgian Grand Prix
Belgian Grand Prix
Grand Prix
June 1953 sports events in Europe